Ioan Viorel Ganea (born 10 August 1973) is a Romanian football manager and striker for Liga IV Sibiu club A.S. Fotbal Club Dumbrăveni.

Playing career
Ganea debuted in Liga I (Divizia A at that time) with FC Brașov in 1994. He went on to play for a number of clubs in Romanian football over the next five years. He joined Rapid Bucharest in January 1999, where he scored 11 goals in the remainder of the season to fire the club to the league championship. He finished that season with 28 goals overall, making him the leading goalscorer.

This form won him a move to Bundesliga side VfB Stuttgart in the summer of 1999. He remained in Germany for four seasons and tasted UEFA Cup action, but was never a regular starter. He moved to Turkish top flight club Bursaspor in June 2003 on a free transfer, but stayed there for just six months before moving to England.

The striker joined Premier League club Wolverhampton Wanderers in December 2003 after his contract in Turkey was cancelled by mutual consent. He scored three Premier League goals during the 2003–04 season – against eventual champions Arsenal, Leeds and Newcastle – but could not prevent relegation.

He remained with the club for two seasons in the second tier, mostly under the managerialship of Glenn Hoddle. The first of these years was written off after suffering cruciate knee ligament injury on a pre-season tour of Norway. He recovered for the 2005–06 season but never held down a regular starting place, and was released as his contract expired at the end of the campaign.

He moved back to Romania, with Dinamo Bucharest on an initial one-year deal. However, just six months later, Ganea broke this contract to rejoin Rapid Bucharest on a record €350,000 ($462,000) a season. Although contracted to the end of 2009 with Rapid, Ganea left on a free transfer in June 2007 for FC Timişoara, despite the fact that he could have earned up to €1 million a season through bonuses at Rapid.

He returned briefly on the pitch as a professional player only for one game on 22 September 2011 in a Romanian Cup match against FC Steaua București.

International career
Ganea made his debut for the Romania national team on 3 March 1999 against Estonia, scoring both goals in a 2–0 win. He represented his country at Euro 2000 and scored a last-minute penalty against England that took Romania to the quarter finals at the expense of their opponent. He made 45 caps and 19 goals, but his last game was in 2006.

Controversy
At the beginning of his career, while playing at FC Brașov, Ganea beat up the team captain Dorel Purdea.

During his stay at U Craiova, Ganea was involved in several controversies. Ganea kicked his teammate Cornel Frăsineanu in the mouth, which left him without a few teeth and for a while he had to eat using a straw. Eugen Trică tried to calm him down but Ionel threatened to beat him too so Trică backed off. He also had a fight with Silvian Cristescu who threw a massage table at his head. On 2 May 1998 Rapid București needed to win the match against U Craiova in order to be sure that they win the Liga I title so they agreed with George Ilinca who was U Craiova's owner to let them win the game. Some players, including Ionel Ganea did not agree to take part in the arrangement, the game ended 2–2 with both of U Craiova's goals being scored by Ganea, and the title was won by Steaua București.

At VfB Stuttgart he had a fight with teammate Jochen Seitz, for which he was punished by the club with a 10.000 marks fine. One day Ganea was eating an ice cream and coach Felix Magath saw him and told him that he shouldn't be eating food that contains too many calories because he has weight issues, Ganea got mad and threw the ice cream at him.

In a match at Euro 2000 against England Ionel was tackled hard by Sol Campbell but the referee did not take any measure against him, so Ionel waited for Campbell to get close to him and when none of the referees were watching he hit him and cussed him: "Motherfucker! Bitch!".
In 2001, he had a fight with the goalkeeper Stelea in a training session that took part before a Romania – Italy game. During the match with the Italians, the striker was one step away from hitting his coach László Bölöni, because he was mad that the coach left him on the bench. During Romania's cantonment for the 2002 World Cup qualification play-off against Slovenia, Ganea played rummy on money with Daniel Chiriță and feeling that Chiriță was cheating, he punched him in the eye, afterwards jumping on him to beat him, before the other teammates intervened to stop him. While playing for Romania against Scotland in April 2004, he tackled Celtic defender John Kennedy resulting in a knee injury that left Kennedy unable to play for three years. Kennedy has since been forced to retire from professional football as a result of this and subsequent injuries.

Steven Gerrard's autobiography contains an episode about an incident between him and Ionel Ganea in a Wolverhampton – Liverpool game played in January 2004: "He tore my leg from the knee to the ankle. Under the puttee, my leg was cut deep, a nasty wound". After finding out what Gerrard wrote about him in his autobiography Ganea told the press:"I inform Gerrard that when I write my autobiography, I will not mention him. I will not have room for little girls".
In April 2006 he was involved in more controversy when he criticised the Wolverhampton Wanderers manager at that time, Glenn Hoddle, claiming "he is the most difficult manager I have worked with in my career". Glenn Hoddle also fined him with a one-week salary for fighting at a training session with a teammate.

While playing for Rapid București in a match against U Craiova he hit opponent's Michael Baird's mouth with his head during half-time.

In August 2007 after a Unirea Urziceni – Politehnica Timișoara game the striker had a conflict with the president of Unirea Urziceni Mihai Stoica, with Ganea grabbing him by the neck until the Gendarmery officers separated them.
One week later, Ganea was banned for 22 matches, which were later reduced to 16, after attacking one of the assistant referees after being sent off during a match between his club Politehnica Timișoara and Rapid București. In his first match played against CFR Cluj after executing the 16 match suspension, he had a verbal conflict with former U Craiova teammate Eugen Trică before the beginning of the match, being close to start a fight after the end of the match.

In 2012 while attending at Ioan Drăgan's funeral, who was his wedding's Godfather and a former FC Brașov teammate he almost got into a fight with the priest, being unsatisfied of the way he was preaching.

While coaching Universitatea Cluj he was accused by player Cristian Mureșan of beating him up but Ganea denied the incident.

During his coaching period at FC Voluntari after a 1–0 victory against CSMS Iași he had a conflict with a female journalist named Alina Iosub in which he offended and cussed her, she also threatened him by saying that if he comes to Botoșani, he won't leave there alive.

His wife, Dana, with which he was married for over 24 years accused him of physical and verbal domestic violence and filled for divorce several times, also asking for a restraining order against him.

Personal life
His son, George is also a footballer.

International stats

International goals
Scores and results table. "Score" indicates the score after the player's goal:

Honours

Club
Universitatea Craiova
 Romanian Cup Runner-up: 1997–98

Rapid București
 Divizia A: 1998–99
 Romanian Super Cup: 1999
 Romanian Cup: 2006–07

VfB Stuttgart
 UEFA Intertoto Cup: 2000, 2002
 Bundesliga Runner-up: 2002–03

Individual
Divizia A top scorer : 1998–99

Coach
Dunărea Călărași
Liga III: 2014–15

References

External links
 
 
 

1973 births
Living people
People from Făgăraș
Romanian footballers
Association football forwards
FC Brașov (1936) players
FC U Craiova 1948 players
ACF Gloria Bistrița players
FC Rapid București players
VfB Stuttgart players
Bursaspor footballers
Wolverhampton Wanderers F.C. players
FC Dinamo București players
FC Politehnica Timișoara players
Liga I players
Bundesliga players
Süper Lig players
Premier League players
English Football League players
Romanian expatriate footballers
Expatriate footballers in Germany
Expatriate footballers in Turkey
Expatriate footballers in England
Romanian expatriate sportspeople in England
Romanian expatriate sportspeople in Turkey
Expatriate football managers in Moldova
Romania international footballers
UEFA Euro 2000 players
Romanian football managers
FC Rapid București managers
FC Universitatea Cluj managers
FC Dunărea Călărași managers
FC Voluntari managers
ASA 2013 Târgu Mureș managers
ACS Poli Timișoara managers